Rimar contra a Maré was Boss AC's second album released in December 2002 in Portugal. In February 2005, a music video Quieres Dinero, produced by Gotto was nominated at the African Music Video Awards in the Category of Best Special Effects on the South African Channel Channel O.

Track listing

References

2002 albums
Boss AC albums
Contemporary R&B albums